Marques Houtman (born 18 August 1979 in New Bedford, Massachusetts) is a Cape Verdean American basketball point guard. He is an alumnus and two-time Hall of Fame inductee at the University of Massachusetts Dartmouth, where he played college basketball for 2.5 years following 3 semesters at Stonehill College finishing in the sweet 16. Houtman played on the 25–3, #2 in the nation Team at UMD that made it to the Sweet 16 which made him a rare player to play in both Division 2 & 3 NCAA Sweet 16.  Houtman is a regular on the Cape Verde national basketball team, including the squad which won a bronze medal at the FIBA Africa Championship 2007 in Angola. Professionally, Houtman played with the Boston Frenzy, coached by Joe "Jellybean" Bryant, father of Kobe Bryant after graduation. He is also a graduate ('97) of New Bedford High School.

References

1979 births
Living people
African-American basketball players
American people of Cape Verdean descent
Basketball players from Massachusetts
C.D. Primeiro de Agosto men's basketball players
S.L. Benfica basketball players
Cape Verdean men's basketball players
College men's basketball players in the United States
Sportspeople from New Bedford, Massachusetts
Point guards
University of Massachusetts Dartmouth alumni
American men's basketball players
21st-century African-American sportspeople
20th-century African-American sportspeople